Enemy is an EP by American hardcore punk band Blood for Blood. It was released in 1997 by Victory Records.

Track listing
 "I Am the Enemy"
 "Redemption Denied Once Again"
 "My Time Is Yet to Come"

1997 EPs
Blood for Blood albums
Hardcore punk EPs